Anthony Pesela (born 9 June 2002) is a Motswana sprinter who specializes in the 400 metres. He was the gold medallist at the World Athletics U20 Championships in 2021.

References

External links 

 Anthony Pesela at World Athletics

2002 births
Living people
Botswana male sprinters
World Athletics U20 Championships winners
African Championships in Athletics winners
Athletes (track and field) at the 2022 Commonwealth Games
Commonwealth Games silver medallists for Botswana
Commonwealth Games medallists in athletics
Medallists at the 2022 Commonwealth Games